Pizza Frenzy is an arcade-style pizza delivery game written by Sprout Games and published by PopCap Games. A trial Windows version of the game can be downloaded and played for an hour, with full capabilities unlockable for a fee.

Gameplay 
The objective of Pizza Frenzy is to quickly deliver the correct pizzas to customers. The game levels take place in a number of different locations, with each location having a unique topography, including two or more pizza kitchens. Each of these kitchens is responsible for producing and delivering pizzas with a specific topping. During gameplay, customers will appear with an icon representing a specific pizza topping they are calling to order. This icon must be clicked, and the player must then click on the correct pizza kitchen in order to dispatch the ordered pizza to the customer. If players take too long, or try to deliver the wrong pizza, the customer hangs up the phone, causing a decrease in overall customer satisfaction (represented by stars). If customer satisfaction dips low enough (no stars remaining), the game ends.

Before every level starts, the player picks which pizza toppings will be available for order on that level. The number of kitchens varies by level, but ranges from two to four. The actual topping selected for a kitchen has no impact on the game, with the caveat that higher level toppings earn more money. After a certain number of levels are completed, the player earns or unlocks an additional topping of his or her choice. The new toppings from which the player can choose include both standard toppings (e.g. olives or mushrooms), as well as items not normally associated with pizza (e.g. donuts, chocolate or French fries).

After the initial game levels, some percentage of the callers placing orders are actually criminals intent on hurting the pizza business. These include thieves, prank callers, and vandals. If players mistakenly take an order from such an individual, there will be negative effects, such as loss of tip money, a missed order, or a decrease in customer satisfaction. Instead, players must move the order to a police station when such a caller is observed, causing the police to arrest the caller and to provide a monetary reward. Although it can be difficult to spot criminals amidst the fast-paced flurry of mouse clicks, their presence is often alerted by a distinct auditory cue similar to a police radio.

The game also includes callers who have other (not necessarily negative) effects when their orders are successfully placed. Such callers include a chatty female customer or a gossip who convinces other waiting customers to change their orders to match hers, a clown that makes other customers change their orders to another randomly, a banker who collects tips for a brief period of time so that the player can focus on other things, a movie star who gives huge tips, and a monk who causes time to temporarily slow down. Much like the police, these unique callers have their own auditory cues upon appearing.

There are three game modes available: "Speed", "Memory" and "Simon Says". Speed is the standard game mode, where players have to complete orders before customers hang up their phone. The player can hold multiple orders of the same topping at once here, which is possible by achieving a combo for the topping. In Memory, players are given a set number of orders at once. These orders are revealed for a few seconds before the player can click on any of them, requiring the player to memorize the topping of each particular order. In Simon Says, players must deliver a series of orders appearing in a fixed order. The player is required to memorize which order appears first using a visual cue as a hint.

Reception 
The GameSpot review of the title praised its uniqueness and sense of humor, while noting that it rarely reaches the titular frenzied level of action, instead displaying a lack of sustained difficulty. Nonetheless, the reviewer did apparently appreciate the game's music and style, leading to an overall score of 7.4 out of 10. PC Zone magazine states that Pizza Frenzy is "an extremely shallow if well presented dish", giving it a score of 45/100.

References

External links 
Official homepage

2005 video games
Action video games
Business simulation games
Flash games
PopCap games
Video games about food and drink
Video games developed in the United States
Windows games
Windows-only games
Single-player video games